In geometry, the (angular) defect (or deficit or deficiency) means the failure of some angles to add up to the expected amount of 360° or 180°, when such angles in the Euclidean plane would. The opposite notion is the excess.

Classically the defect arises in two ways:
 the defect of a vertex of a polyhedron;
 the defect of a hyperbolic triangle;
and the excess also arises in two ways:
 the excess of a toroidal polyhedron.
 the excess of a spherical triangle;
In the Euclidean plane, angles about a point add up to 360°, while interior angles in a triangle add up to 180° (equivalently, exterior angles add up to 360°). However, on a convex polyhedron the angles at a vertex add up to less than 360°, on a spherical triangle the interior angles always add up to more than 180° (the exterior angles add up to less than 360°), and the angles in a hyperbolic triangle always add up to less than 180° (the exterior angles add up to more than 360°).

In modern terms, the defect at a vertex or over a triangle (with a minus) is precisely the curvature at that point or the total (integrated) over the triangle, as established by the Gauss–Bonnet theorem.

Defect of a vertex 
For a polyhedron, the defect at a vertex equals 2π minus the sum of all the angles at the vertex (all the faces at the vertex are included).  If a polyhedron is convex, then the defect of each vertex is always positive.  If the sum of the angles exceeds a full turn, as occurs in some vertices of many non-convex polyhedra, then the defect is negative.

The concept of defect extends to higher dimensions as the amount by which the sum of the dihedral angles of the cells at a peak falls short of a full circle.

Examples

The defect of any of the vertices of a regular dodecahedron (in which three regular pentagons meet at each vertex) is 36°, or π/5 radians, or 1/10 of a circle. Each of the angles measures 108°; three of these meet at each vertex, so the defect is 360° − (108° + 108° + 108°) = 36°.

The same procedure can be followed for the other Platonic solids:

Descartes' theorem
Descartes' theorem on the "total defect" of a polyhedron states that if the polyhedron is homeomorphic to a sphere (i.e. topologically equivalent to a sphere, so that it may be deformed into a sphere by stretching without tearing), the "total defect", i.e. the sum of the defects of all of the vertices, is two full circles (or 720° or 4π radians).  The polyhedron need not be convex.

A generalization says the number of circles in the total defect equals the Euler characteristic of the polyhedron. This is a special case of the Gauss–Bonnet theorem which relates the integral of the Gaussian curvature to the Euler characteristic. Here the Gaussian curvature is concentrated at the vertices: on the faces and edges the Gaussian curvature is zero and the integral of Gaussian curvature at a vertex is equal to the defect there.

This can be used to calculate the number V of vertices of a polyhedron by totaling the angles of all the faces, and adding the total defect. This total will have one complete circle for every vertex in the polyhedron. Care has to be taken to use the correct Euler characteristic for the polyhedron.

A converse to this theorem is given by Alexandrov's uniqueness theorem, according to which a metric space that is locally Euclidean except for a finite number of points of positive angular defect, adding to 4π, can be realized in a unique way as the surface of a convex polyhedron.

Positive defects on non-convex figures
It is tempting to think that every non-convex polyhedron must have some vertices whose defect is negative, but this need not be the case. Two counterexamples to this are the small stellated dodecahedron and the great stellated dodecahedron, which have twelve convex points each with positive defects. 

A counterexample which does not intersect itself is provided by a cube where one face is replaced by a square pyramid: this elongated square pyramid is convex and the defects at each vertex are each positive.  Now consider the same cube where the square pyramid goes into the cube: this is concave, but the defects remain the same and so are all positive.

Negative defect indicates that the vertex resembles a saddle point, whereas positive defect indicates that the vertex resembles a local maximum or minimum.

References

Notes

Bibliography
Richeson, D.; Euler's Gem: The Polyhedron Formula and the Birth of Topology, Princeton (2008), Pages 220–225.

External links

Polyhedra
Hyperbolic geometry